Sur Shafilat (also Romanized as Sūr Shafīʿlāt; also known as Sūr Shafīlāt) is a village in Shabkhus Lat Rural District, Rankuh District, Amlash County, Gilan Province, Iran. At the 2006 census, its population was 321, in 89 families.

References 

Populated places in Amlash County